Thomas John Augustus Griffin (27 July 1832 – 1 June 1868) was an Australian police officer and gold commissioner who was executed in 1868, after being found guilty of the double murder of two fellow police officers, Constable John Francis Power and Constable Patrick William Cahill.

The murders were committed on the banks of the Mackenzie River near the present-day site of the Bedford Weir at Blackwater, Queensland while the troopers were escorting a large sum of money from Rockhampton to Clermont, which Griffin stole and then hid when he returned to Rockhampton. The money was discovered after Griffin was executed when it was revealed he had attempted to conspire with a turnkey while locked in his cell, negotiating a possible escape and drawing a pencil sketch of the money's approximate location.

In a notorious case of grave robbery, Griffin's grave was illegally exhumed more than a week after his execution, and his body deliberately decapitated and his head stolen.

Early life
Griffin was born in Sligo, Ireland in 1832. At the age of 17, Griffin joined the Irish Constabulary before volunteering to serve for the British Army in the Crimean War where he initially worked as an assistant storekeeper in the commissariat department before obtaining a commission as cornet in the Turkish contingent.

For his service in Crimea, Griffin was awarded medals for distinguished service. When his service in Crimea finished, Griffin accepted an offer of free travel to Australia that was made available to police volunteers who served in the war, arriving in Melbourne in late 1856.

During the journey, Griffin is believed to have become acquainted with a wealthy widow, who he later married but then after squandering her money, abandoned her before making her believe he had died by having his own death notice published in a newspaper which he then sent her, pretending it had been sent by one of his friends.

Police career
With his previous experience with the Ireland Constabulary and his service in Crimea, Griffin entered the police force in Australia.

Rockhampton
Just prior to the separation of Queensland from New South Wales, Griffin arrived in Rockhampton in 1858 as an Acting Sergeant with the New South Wales Police Force before he rose to the rank of Rockhampton's Chief Constable.

After serving as Chief Constable in Rockhampton, Griffin was transferred to Brisbane in 1862 where he was appointed Acting Clerk of Petty Sessions, before he was appointed to the position permanently at the beginning of 1863.

Brisbane
During his time in Brisbane, Griffin became enamoured with the sister of a Queensland cabinet minister. It is believed Griffin influenced the minister into appointing him to higher positions by alluding to a desire to marry the minister's sister but expressing a belief that he was unable to marry until he was working in a higher-paying position. As such, Griffin was appointed to gold commissioner and police magistrate in Clermont, Queensland – the hub of the Peak Downs goldfields.

Clermont
Griffin spent four years at Clermont, during which he became widely known. He was known to be a compulsive gambler which included frequent visits to a gambling house where it is believed Griffin accrued substantial debts after suffering considerable losses.

During his time in Clermont, Griffin's character and personality was polarising. In his 1904 book, The Early History of Rockhampton, historian and journalist J. T. S. Bird described Griffin as having a very suave and attractive manner, readily gaining the friendship of those he desired to stand well with, but was also distant and overbearing and not well-liked. Although courteous to a degree, Griffin was also described as brusque.

One of the people that Griffin drew the ire of was magistrate (and future Member for Clermont) Oscar de Satge who lodged a complaint with the Colonial Secretary in April 1866, detailing various issues he had with Griffin including interference with the Bench and misuse of troopers' time along with other matters that de Satge believe warranted inquiry., including an allegation of Griffin stealing a letter addressed to de Satge.

It was de Satge's name that headed a list of twenty signatures on a petition that was forwarded to the Colonial Secretary asking for Griffin's removal from Clermont, after a public meeting was held which was chaired by the Clermont mayor. At the meeting two resolutions were carried. The first stated that it was desirable for the welfare of the community that Thomas John Griffin should be removed from his position as Police Magistrate in consequence of the inefficient and unsatisfactory discharge of his magisterial duties. The second resolution stated that Griffin was despotic, arbitrary and partial and that Griffin had lost the confidence of the public. At the meeting, Dr. Spiridion Candiottis, who was once a good friend of Griffin's, expressed his scathing views of Griffin stating that he had only been appointed to such a high position by an unscrupulous minister.

Griffin denied de Satge's allegations and requested an inquiry be held so he could clear his name. A Civil Service Board was convened in Rockhampton where complaints about Griffin were heard, but it was rule that de Satge's allegations into Griffin's interference with the Bench were unfounded and that there was no evidence to support claims Griffin had used troopers as servants. The evidence presented by manager of the Australian Joint Stock Bank, Thomas Skarratt Hall, was considered to have exonerated Griffin.

Despite this, it was decided that Griffin would be removed back to Rockhampton in the position as Assistant Gold Commissioner. Before his departure from Clermont in October 1867, Griffin was afforded a farewell dinner where 35 men dined at Clermont's Leichhardt Hotel where they sang For He's A Jolly Good Fellow at the conclusion of the evening.

In his speech on the night, Griffin said he felt honoured by the way his name had been received and that it was proof that the guests did not endorse the allegations that had been made against him, describing the statements made by Dr. Candiottis as false.

Return to Rockhampton
After leaving Clermont, Griffin arrived in Rockhampton to take up his new position on 19 October 1867. Two days prior, a gold escort had arrived in Rockhampton from Clermont escorted by Sergeant James Julian and two troopers.

Gold escorts were regular delivery services that operated between settlements on the goldfields, such as Clermont, and major towns like Rockhampton, where gold was escorted to the bank by authorised police officers and exchanged for cash, which was then escorted back to the bank's rural branches.

When he arrived in Rockhampton, Griffin began making arrangements for when the next gold escort would travel back to Clermont and who the troopers would be that would accompany it.

Gold escort
The next gold escort, to transport money from Rockhampton to Clermont, experienced a week of delays and false starts. The original party consisting of Griffin, Trooper Patrick Cahill and Sergeant James Julian attempted the journey but turned around and returned to Rockhampton twice. On the first occasion, they had reached Stanwell before returning for their horses to be shod. On the second occasion, they had reached Gracemere before Griffin claimed he had left a parcel of gold behind at the Rockhampton Club which had arrived on the last escort by mistake, and wanted the party to return to Rockhampton to collect it.

The party, now consisting of Griffin, Cahill and Trooper John Power, finally left Rockhampton for Clermont on 1 November 1867, with Griffin indicating that he intended to travel with Cahill and Power only part of the way before returning to Rockhampton.

Upon reaching the Mackenzie River, the three men camped near the Bedford Arms hotel, run by Alfred Harding Bedford. Bedford made arrangements with Griffin to travel back to Rockhampton with him the following day. Griffin and Bedford camped separately to Power and Cahill who were preparing to begin making their way to Clermont the same night.

Bedford later reporting hearing gunshots during the night, which awoke him to discover Griffin not present. When Griffin returned, Bedford asked him about the shots that he had heard, but Griffin explained it away saying that he had gone to look for the horses but had got lost and had fired his pistol in an attempt to attract attention.

In the early hours of 6 November 1867, Griffin and Bedford travelled back to Westwood on horseback, camping one night at Gainsford, before catching the train back to Rockhampton from Westwood, which in 1867 was the end of the line with the railway further westward yet to be constructed.

Discovery of bodies
After Griffin had arrived back in Rockhampton, news broke that Cahill and Power had been discovered dead near where they had camped on the Mackenzie River near Bedford's hotel, with the money that they had been escorting to Clermont missing.

A party, including Griffin, was assembled to travel to the scene to investigate the deaths which were initially believed to have been a result of poisoning, after the discovery of two dead pigs near the scene. However, after a post-mortem examination by Dr. David Salmond, it was discovered the two troopers had both been shot in the head. No evidence of poison was found, but Dr. Salmond did express an initial view of the two men being affected by a narcotic of some form and were shot while in a "state of stupor" from its effects.

Arrest
Griffin was arrested at the scene at approximately 10 am on 11 November 1867 following the exhumation of the two bodies which had been temporarily buried on the banks of the Mackenzie River, awaiting an initial post-mortem examination which revealed the two men had been shot. A search warrant was executed on Griffin's property but nothing suspicious was uncovered.

Media coverage
The newspaper coverage of Griffin's arrest also became a story of its own when the editors of Rockhampton's fiercely competitive newspapers The Rockhampton Bulletin and Central Queensland Advertiser and The Northern Argus began accusing each other of unprofessional reporting. The Argus accused The Bulletin of "pointing the finger" at Griffin
. The Bulletin denied the charges, describing the claims as "foolish" and "slanderous" while accusing The Argus of committing the "equally grave offence" of defending Griffin.

Police court
The public interest in the murders was so great that a huge crowd had gathered to watch Griffin's first appearance at the Rockhampton Police Court on 21 November 1867. When the doors to the Court House were opened, a rush of people entered the building in a desperate attempt to secure sitting or standing room, while people also crowded onto the verandah and crowded around the windows outside to peer in at the proceedings. During the proceedings, Griffin's legal team consisting of Rees Rutland Jones and Henry John Milford complained about not being allowed to speak to their client privately, with Jones asking how they were expected to defend their client if they weren't allowed to speak to Griffin without the presence of a third party in a case of life and death.

After a string of depositions from various witnesses and the subsequent cross examinations, the evidence accumulated throughout the police court proceedings mainly related to the money Griffin owed to Chinese miners, Griffin's handwriting in a receipt book apparently matching that written on notes believed to have been stolen from the gold escort, the money Griffin used when buying drinks at the Commercial Hotel which was also believed to have been stolen from the escort, various transactions with the Australian Joint Stock Bank, and his behaviour leading up to his departure from Rockhampton with Cahill and Power.

At the conclusion of proceedings, Griffin was asked if he had anything to say. In reply, Griffin said he was innocent of the charges against him and had he been allowed the common privilege afforded to other suspected felons, he would not be standing where he was. Griffin then said he was advised to reserve his defence. He was then committed to stand trial which was due to be held in March 1868.

Trial

Proceedings at the Rockhampton Circuit Court, presided over by Justice Alfred Lutwyche, commenced on 16 March 1868 where Thomas John Griffin was indicted for "feloniously, wilfully, and of malice aforethought, kill and murder Patrick Cahill and John Power". When asked by the Clerk of Arraigns as to how he pleaded, Griffin replied emphatically "Not Guilty". A jury, of twelve jurors, was empannelled on 18 March 1868.

The trial concluded on 24 March 1868 when the jury deliberated before re-entering the courtroom at 4:12 pm with its verdict of "Guilty".  After being asked if he had any reason why he shouldn't receive the death penalty, Griffin made a lengthy statement before the Justice Lutwyche made his closing remarks:

"Thomas John Griffin, you have been found guilty, by a jury of your countrymen, of the crime of wilful murder, and I can say sitting in my place here, I never heard circumstantial evidence of guilt more satisfactory, or more conclusive. I will add little to give you more pain. My own feelings are deep and painful enough when I see you in your position, convicted of a crime unparalleled in the annals of Australian history. I am unequal to the task of expressing the pain, the anguish, and the horror I feel. I’ll only do what the law compels me, that is to pass its sentence, and that is: you, Thomas John Griffin, be taken from the place where you stand to the place from whence you came, and there, at such time as may be appointed by the Acting Governor, with advice from the Executive Council, be hanged from the neck until you are dead, and may God, in His infinite mercy, have mercy on your soul." – Justice Alfred LutwycheRockhampton Circuit Court: Criminal Sittings (24 March) – Murder (Part II) The Rockhampton Bulletin and Central Queensland Advertiser, 26 March 1868. Retrieved (via NLA) 18 March 2017.

Execution
Griffin was hanged at the Rockhampton Gaol on 1 June 1868.

Griffin became the first person to be executed in Rockhampton. His was the first of nine legal executions that took place in Rockhampton between 1868 and 1890.

He appeared to maintain his innocence prior to his death denying his guilt to everyone he saw in the prison including Reverend Alexander Smith from the Presbyterian Church who spent time with Griffin before his death. Smith had earlier complained to the Attorney-General about the police magistrate denying him entry on the grounds that Griffin belonged to the Church of England rather than the Presbyterian Church.

On the morning of the execution, Griffin dressed in formal wear and prayed with Reverend Smith at the foot of the scaffold which included reciting the Lord's Prayer.

After again denying his guilt to Reverend Smith, he climbed the steps of the scaffold when he was again asked by the hangman if he had anything to confess to which Griffin replied firmly: "No. I have nothing to confess!".

After Griffin's execution, his body was placed in a coffin and transported to the Rockhampton Cemetery where he was buried in the Church of England section of the grounds.

Various souvenirs were collected after Griffin's execution. It is believed the clothes that Griffin was hanged in, along with his beard which was shaved off, went to the hangman, John Hutton. Griffin's service medals went to a local solicitor while his gold watch was sold to a slaughterman. The revolver he is said to have shot Cahill and Power with went to Carella Station, near Jundah on the Thomson River but was destroyed in a fire.

Confession
After Griffin's execution, it was reported that he had actually confessed to his crime in his cell, but only after he had been informed that his death warrant had been signed. Turnkey Alfred Grant was said to have witnessed Griffin pacing up and down in his cell muttering before declaring: "It's no bloody good, I did it!".

Griffin is then believed to have attempted to negotiate with Grant about a possible escape if he confessed to where he hid the money he stole from the gold escort, promising Grant a portion of the money. After Griffin provided a pencil sketch of the money's approximate location, Grant is then said to have planned a night excursion with principal turnkey John Lee. Despite two attempts, Grant and Lee failed to find the hidden money. After informing the Sheriff, they were given permission to attempt to find the money again. After failing again, the Sheriff informed Tom Skarratt Hall who organised a party to search for the money.

On this occasion, they found a half-burnt tree stump obscured by another tree stump that had been placed up against it. When they removed the second stump, they found the valise with the missing notes which had been rolled up inside it, slightly damaged by the rain.

Grant revealed that Griffin had told him that as he approached Power and Cahill's camp, Power fired his weapon at him but the bullet narrowly missed him, passing through his beard. Griffin said he returned fire which woke Cahill. When Cahill attempted to fire his pistol, the cap exploded. On the second attempt, the pistol exploded causing Cahill to accidentally shoot himself. With both the troopers dead, Griffin said he decided to make the best of the situation and steal the money, destroying their wrappers in the camp fire and rolling the notes into a swag-shaped bundle. On their way back to Rockhampton, Griffin said he made sure that Alfred Bedford rode in front, due to the "swag" working loose. Once back in Rockhampton, Griffin went to the Rockhampton Club where he put the notes in a valise before going out to find a hiding spot. Grant said that Griffin had told him where the money was on the condition he remit £500 to his sister back in Ireland. Griffin's version of how the troopers died was met with cynicism in the local press.

It was also discovered that Griffin had also probably confessed to his friend (and Rees Jones' father-in-law) William John "Brown the Magnificent" Brown, after a letter that Griffin had written to Brown was discovered where he referred to an earlier conversation. It is believed Griffin had told Brown the same story that he had told Grant, with Brown seemingly urging Griffin to confess to the authorities. In the letter, Griffin replied that he believed public feeling was so strong against him, it would be pointless to make any statements as they would be immediately dismissed. It is also believed that Griffin told Brown that he suspected undue influence had been exerted to pursue his condemnation.

In 2008, an ABC Capricornia story contained a claim that there had also been a written confession which had been later discovered to have been written by someone else, and dated two days after Griffin's execution.

Exhumation and decapitation
More than a week after Griffin's execution, the sexton reported that he believed Griffin's grave at the Rockhampton Cemetery had been disturbed, which led to a bizarre case of grave robbery being uncovered.

A special meeting of the Rockhampton Cemetery Board was held at Rockhampton Customs House where the board was advised that they had received special permission from the Colonial Secretary the previous night to remove the body from Griffin's grave. A motion was carried to carry out an examination. The board also carried a motion to advise the sexton to obtain assistance to dig a second grave for the corpse of an unknown man that was believed to have been buried on top of Griffin's grave. An additional motion was carried to acquire the services of Dr. David Salmond to carry out the necessary examination of the dead bodies.

At 4 pm that afternoon, a group of people including trustees and secretary of the Rockhampton Cemetery Board, Dr. Salmond and Dr. Guido Thon, Sergeant Judge and three constables, gathered at the Rockhampton Cemetery.  After they dug two feet, the first coffin was uncovered. After it was opened, the body of the unknown man was discovered. Although the coffin looked like it had been opened and refastened, the body looked as if it had not been interfered with. That coffin was then reburied in the new grave that had been dug.

The second coffin was then raised out of the grave and the lid unfastened only for Griffin's body to be discovered without its head.

The corpse was taken out of the coffin for the doctors to do their examination where they confirmed the headless body belonged to Griffin.  After the examination where it was confirmed the head had been removed, the body was placed back in the coffin and reburied in the same grave.

Media coverage
After previously criticising each other's coverage of Griffin's arrest, Rockhampton's two local newspapers were again at odds over each other's coverage and publicly stated positions regarding the events that took place in the cemetery.

In an editorial, the editor of The Rockhampton Bulletin and Central Queensland Advertiser described the act as "human vengeance" which had done its worst on the victim, and expressed the view that Griffin was entitled to the rest of his grave and it should have been "sacred from violation as that of any other sinner".

This provoked its rival The Northern Argus, which published an editorial highly critical of the views expressed in The Bulletin. The editor of The Argus clearly expressed that they didn't see anything wrong with Griffin's head having been cut off, nor did they view the act as desecration or criminal. The editor took most offence at The Bulletin referring to Griffin as a "victim", and also criticised the sexton for having another body placed above that of a murderer.

The Argus also described the small £20 reward offered by the Queensland Government for information conclusive as to the lack of importance the authorities regarded the matter, adding that if anyone involved in the affair who did report their companions to the authorities deserved to be whipped round the town with a cat's tail.

The same day, The Bulletin took a completely opposite position, and expressed its outrage over such a small reward, stating their belief that it made not the slightest difference whether it was the head of a saint or a sinner, and that Griffin had as much right to his grave as the Lord Mayor of London. The Bulletin also described the Government as a disgrace for an offering less money than what they would offer for a good horse or bullock, describing the desecration as an act of barbarity.

It was later revealed a Northern Argus journalist was one of those present when the grave robbery took place.

Identities of perpetrators revealed
Speculation was rife from the outset that the persons responsible were men with an interest in medicine and the science of phrenology, and that they had hoped to study the shape of Griffin's skull in an attempt to find an explanation for the crime he was convicted for.

A series of newspaper articles published in the early 20th century eventually shed some light as to who was responsible for the grave robbery.

In July 1918, a newspaper article was published in The Morning Bulletin where a letter that former Rockhampton Police Magistrate William Henry Wiseman had written fifty years earlier to a member of the Queensland Government was discussed, where Wiseman claimed the head was actually removed from the body in the first coffin instead of from Griffin's body in the coffin underneath. In the article, Rockhampton journalist and historian J. T. S. Bird confirmed that Wiseman had got it wrong, and that it was indeed Griffin's head that had been stolen. Bird added that the main culprit was a local Rockhampton doctor who took the head away, buried it in a friend's garden, before collecting it. Bird claims it was in the doctor's local surgery until his death.

The publication of the article and Bird's comments prompted former Northern Argus journalist William Henry Leighton Bailey to write to The Morning Bulletin in October 1918, after his friend George Curtis had sent him a copy of the newspaper. In the letter, published on 19 December 1918, Leighton Bailey claims that Bird's version is nearest to the truth as to who had Griffin's head.

Leighton Bailey confessed that he was one of the men involved in the grave robbery, and that there was no mistaking that it was indeed Griffin's head.

Leighton Bailey also alleged that local bank manager Robert Hoddle Driberg (R. H. D.) White was also present when the head was removed.

Leighton Bailey alleged that the local doctor who actually took the head into his possession was William Callaghan.

Callaghan had died in 1912, having been a well known local identity in Rockhampton since his arrival in July 1861. Aside from his medical work, Callaghan was well known in horse racing circles and a member of the Rockhampton Jockey Club. At the time of his death, preparations were being made to officially name Rockhampon's horse racing venue Callaghan Park in his honour, which it is still called today.

In 1922, Melbourne newspaper The Australasian published an article about the removal of Griffin's head, which detailed the discussions that took place prior to the event and the event itself. The writer of the article claims that the skull was displayed at some stage in a glass cabinet in a drawing room.

In 1928, The Australasian published a follow-up article after receiving a letter from newspaper journalist James Grant Pattison. Pattison provided The Australasian with a copy of a letter that J. T. S. Bird had sent him, confirming that it was Dr. William Callaghan who had removed Griffin's head.

In the letter, Bird also alleges a hospital wardsman named William Holland was also present when the head was removed.

Bird also claimed Callaghan had showed him Griffin's skull several times and that it was kept in Callaghan's surgery.

The Australasian also published an extract from a letter written by Dr. Callaghan to well known horseman John Arthur Macartney, dated 25 October 1900, in which Callaghan tells Macartney that the head is in Rockhampton and that he can see it any time while he's in town.

In the letter, Callaghan also claimed the Premier of Queensland, Sir Arthur Palmer had indicated that he knew it was him who had possession of Griffin's skull, when he directly asked Callaghan if he had "a specimen of anatomy" at his house. When Callaghan said yes, Palmer replied that the £20 reward the government offered for information about Griffin's head was "£19/19s/11d too much – but I had to do something." The letter was also published in James Grant Pattison's 1939 book, Battler's Tales of Early Rockhampton but with the names omitted.

Historian Lorna McDonald also alleges that William Callaghan was the man who removed Griffin's head in her 1981 book, Rockhampton: A History of City & District.

Current condition and location of Griffin's skull
In his 1939 book, James Grant Pattison claimed the skull was in a glass case for many years but it was damaged when one of the holder's children attempted to practice dentistry by smashing the lower jaw to obtain the teeth.

Pattison claimed it was passed onto Rockhampton School of Arts in 1934 but it is unclear where Griffin's skull is now, or if the £20 reward (decimalised and adjusted for inflation) would still stand today for information leading to its location, and a possible return to Griffin's grave.

There is have been some unsubstantiated reports that the skull is now sitting on a shelf in an upper class private residence in Rockhampton.

Power and Cahill's funeral
A public funeral was held in Rockhampton for Cahill and Power on 15 July 1869 – more than twenty months after their deaths. A service at the Roman Catholic Church was held before the procession made its way to the cemetery where a burial service took place, which included three volleys being fired over the grave at the conclusion of the service.

20th century analysis
Rockhampton's two most prominent historians, J. T. S. Bird and Dr. Lorna McDonald, both wrote about Griffin in their respective historical texts, but both had conflicting thoughts as to Griffin's guilt.

In his 1904 book, The Early History of Rockhampton, J.T.S. Bird state that there "was never a shadow of a doubt that Griffin being the real murderer, and richly deserving the fate which overtook him".

McDonald takes a more sympathetic view in her 1981 book Rockhampton: A History of City & District, suggesting that Griffin's mental state prior to the Gold Escort leaving Rockhampton was ignored, particularly Sergeant Julian's stated belief that Griffin was in the first stages of delirium tremens.

McDonald wrote that "with the advantage of hindsight, it is apparent that Griffin suffered from some form of mental illness, possibly schizophrenia" but as there was little knowledge of such an illness in the 1860s, his trial inevitably ended with his execution.

Legacy
In 2008, the story of the Cahill and Power murders was incorporated into a presentation at the Queensland Police Museum in Roma Street, Brisbane.

The Queensland Police Service residence officially opened at Herston in 2005 are known as the Patrick William Cahill Unit and the John Francis Power Unit, named in Cahill and Power's honour.

Queensland Water Police vessels, P.W. Cahill I and P.W. Cahill II were also named in Cahill's honour.

In July 2013, after a push by former Blackwater police officer Donna Gilliland, plaques were erected on the graves of Cahill and Power at the South Rockhampton Cemetery and memorial stones were placed at the present-day site of the Bedford Weir on the Mackenzie River, where the murders took place.

The plans to erect the memorial at the Bedford Weir were hindered when two trunks of petrified wood, donated by the BHP Mitsubishi Alliance, were stolen by thieves. It had been planned that the two trunks would form part of the memorial.

References 

1832 births
1868 deaths
Australian police officers
19th-century executions by Australia
Australian people convicted of murdering police officers
1867 murders in Australia